Wilson Leite Braga (18 July 1931 – 17 May 2020), better known as simply Wilson Braga, was a Brazilian politician, lawyer and businessman from the state of Paraíba.

Life
Before pursuing a career in politics, Braga graduated in law at Federal University of Paraíba.

In 1954, Braga was elected member of the Legislative Assembly of Paraíba and held the post from 1955 to 1967.

In 1966, he was elected member of the Chamber of Deputies representing his birth state of Paraíba. He remained in power from 1967 to 1982.

In 1982, he was elected governor of Paraíba, remaining from 1983 to 1987.

In 1988, he was elected mayor of João Pessoa. He kept the post from 1989 to 1990.

In 1992, he was elected city councillor of João Pessoa, retaining the post from 1993 to 1994.

In 1994, he was again elected member of the Chamber of Deputies from Paraíba. This time he remained in power from 1995 to 2003.

In 2006, he was elected member of the Chamber of Deputies from Paraíba for the third and last time, keeping the post from 2007 to 2011.

In 2010, he was again elected member of the Legislative Assembly of Paraíba and held the post from 2011 to 2015, retiring from politics afterwards.

Personal life
Braga, was married to Lúcia Braga, a politician, who held two political posts: member of the Chamber of Deputies from Paraíba (1987–1995 and 2003–2007) and member of the Legislative Assembly of Paraíba (1999–2003). Braga's wife died from COVID-19 on May 8, 2020.

Death
On 17 May 2020, Braga died in João Pessoa, from COVID-19 during the COVID-19 pandemic in Brazil at the age 88, only ten days after his wife Lúcia, who also succumbed to the same illness.

References

1931 births
2020 deaths
Members of the Chamber of Deputies (Brazil) from Paraíba
Members of the Legislative Assembly of Paraíba
Brazilian Democratic Movement politicians
National Renewal Alliance politicians
Democratic Social Party politicians
Democrats (Brazil) politicians
Brazilian Social Democracy Party politicians
Brazilian Socialist Party politicians
Democratic Labour Party (Brazil) politicians
Social Democratic Party (Brazil, 2011) politicians
Governors of Paraíba
Deaths from the COVID-19 pandemic in Paraíba